The fourteenth season of Australian reality television series The Block premiered on August 5, 2018, on the Nine Network. Hosts Scott Cam and Shelley Craft, site foreman Keith Schleiger with Dan Reilly, and judges Neale Whitaker, Shaynna Blaze and Darren Palmer, all returned from the previous season, with special guests William Schirripa and Roshan Abraham.

Production
In June 2017, The Block producers lodged renovation plans for The Gatwick Hotel with Port Phillip City Council. In October 2017, the fourteenth season and location of The Block were officially confirmed at Nine's upfronts.

Applications for the fourteenth season of the series opened in August 2017 until 10 September 2017, looking for couples aged between 18 and 65 years old being sought by casting agents. Filming for the season was originally slated to occur between January 2018 and April 2018, however filming didn't begin until early February.

Contestants
This is the sixth season of The Block to have five couples instead of the traditional four couples.

Score history

Weekly Room Prize

Challenge Apartment

Results

Judges' scores
 Colour key:
  Highest Score
  Lowest Score

Challenge scores

Domain Prize
Each week during the weekly walkthrough, Alice Stolz from Domain will judge each team's current room. She judges each room on suitability, continuity and flow, functionality, progress & budget. The weekly winner will be awarded a $10,000 weekly prize that is split equally in cash and marketing with domain. Each week the points are tallied and the team at the end with the highest score will have themselves and their property featured on the cover of Domain Magazine.

Auction

Ratings

Notes
Ratings data is from OzTAM and represents the live and same day average viewership from the 5 largest Australian metropolitan centres (Sydney, Melbourne, Brisbane, Perth and Adelaide).
In Apartment 1 resided a secret vault of which the contents were unknown until it was opened. Whoever selected Apartment 1 (Kerrie & Spence) were able to open it and take ownership of the contents within. The vault contained a 1 point gnome, $10,000 Suncorp budget card, $5,000 TV Mirror voucher, $50,000 Sub Zero voucher, $50,000 Gaggenau voucher, $6,300 Reece voucher, $15,000 Freedom Furniture voucher, $10,000 Beacon Lighting voucher, and a Domain Masterclass for feedback and advice on their apartment.
Real Estate Agent, John McGrath, filled in Darren Palmer during week three's Master Ensuite judging reveal.
Kerrie and Spence originally scored 26½ for their Master Ensuite, but used the bonus point they received as part of the safe in week one. Their score was changed to 27½, which gave them a half point overall win over Bianca and Carla.
Kerrie and Spence called a body corporate meeting to skip this challenge due to issues they were having back at the block. The challenge guest judges, Ronnie & Georgia Caceres, took their place and styled the 5th room.
Along with creating their 2nd Guest Bedroom, each contestant were given $5000 from Suncorp to re-do their worst room. These were their re-do rooms:Kerrie & Spence - Living & DiningCourtney & Hans - Master BedroomHayden & Sara - 1st Guest BedroomNorm & Jess - Living & DiningBianca & Carla - Master Bedroom
Weekly judge Shaynna Blaze, chose Norm & Jess’ re-done Living & Dining area as the best re-do. This won them $10,000 to go towards their build.
 The individual scores for Terrace week's Domain prize was not revealed, however Norm & Jess were announced winners of this week's Domain prize. As they were tied with Bianca and Carla for first place the previous week, this means that they won the overall prize; the cover of Domain magazine.

References

2018 Australian television seasons
14